The Levasseur PL.2 was a French biplane torpedo bomber designed by Pierre Levasseur for the French Navy.

Design and development
The second design of Pierre Levasseur was the PL.2, a single-seat unequal-span biplane inspired by designs from Blackburn Aircraft. It had a fixed tailskid landing gear and was powered by a nose-mounted Renault engine. The first of two prototypes first flew in November 1922. The second aircraft had a four-bladed propeller and other powerplant improvements. Nine production aircraft were built in 1923, these were fitted with ballonets and jettisonable landing gear for operations at sea.

Operational history
The aircraft entered service in 1926 aboard the French aircraft carrier Béarn and continued in use until they were scrapped in 1932.

Variants
PL 2 AT-01 : First torpedo-bomber prototype.
PL 2 AT-02 : Second prototype, equipped with a four-blade propeller.
PL.2 : Single-seat torpedo-bomber aircraft, nine built for the French Navy.

Operators

French Navy
Escadrille 7B2

Specifications

References

Notes

Bibliography

Taylor, John W. R. and Jean Alexander. Combat Aircraft of the World. New York: G.P. Putnam's Sons, 1969. .  
Taylor, Michael J. H. Jane's Encyclopedia of Aviation. London: Studio Editions, 1989. . 

Levasseur PL.02
Carrier-based aircraft
Levasseur aircraft
Biplanes
Single-engined tractor aircraft
Aircraft first flown in 1922